Đorđe Petronijević (Ђорђе Петронијевић; also transliterated Djordje; born 28 June 1961) is a Yugoslav boxer. He competed in the men's welterweight event at the 1988 Summer Olympics.

References

External links
 

1961 births
Living people
Yugoslav male boxers
Olympic boxers of Yugoslavia
Boxers at the 1988 Summer Olympics
Place of birth missing (living people)
Welterweight boxers